Josep Lluis Cunill Gomez (born October 20, 1990 in Mountain View, California) is an Anglo-Spanish professional racing driver, who races professionally under the name "Siso" Cunill.

Cunill began his racing career in 2006, driving in the Copa de España class of the Spanish Formula Three Championship. In the six races he competed in, he took three class podiums to finish 6th in the standings. He also participated in selected races of the Belgian Formula Renault 1.6 championship, scoring a single championship point.

For 2007, Cunill took part in a full Spanish F3 season, driving for GTA Motor Competicion. Over the course of the year, he took one podium place (in the final round at Barcelona) and three further points scoring positions to finish 14th in the championship.

In 2008, Cunill entered both the Eurocup Formula Renault 2.0 and Italian Formula Renault 2.0 championships, driving for Swiss team Jenzer Motorsport. In the six Eurocup races he contested his best result was a 6th place at Spa-Francorchamps, whilst in the Italian series he finished in the points in eight of his ten races, with his best result also being a 6th-place finish.

In August 2008, he made his debut in the Formula Renault 3.5 Series with the KTR team after both of their regular drivers, Guillaume Moreau and Daniil Move, left the team. Despite only qualifying 23rd, he scored points in his debut race at the Nürburgring, finishing in 10th place after post-race penalties were handed to both Fairuz Fauzy and Esteban Guerrieri.

In 2009 sings for a season with the Konrad Motorsport team, scoring the most runs. In 2010, the team offers renewal to continue for another year

Career results

Karting
(1999)

 3rd Classified Catalan Championship, Category Youngsters.

(2000)

 Champion Championship Catalunya, Category Youngsters.
 Champion Arisco Championship Trophy, Category Youngsters.
 Resistance Catalan Cup Finalist, Category Youngsters.

(2001)

 Runner Up Championship Catalunya cadet category.
 Champion Trophy Championship Arisco, cadet category.
 5th Championship in Spain, Category Cadet.

(2002)

 Runner Up Championship Catalunya cadet category.
 4th Championship of Spain, Category Cadet.

(2003)
 4th Championship of Catalunya, Category Junior.

Formula

Racing record

Complete Formula Renault 3.5 Series results
(key) (Races in bold indicate pole position) (Races in italics indicate fastest lap)

Complete Porsche Supercup results
(key) (Races in bold indicate pole position – 2 points awarded 2008 onwards in all races) (Races in italics indicate fastest lap)

Notes

References

External links
 Official website
 

1990 births
Living people
Spanish racing drivers
Euroformula Open Championship drivers
Formula Renault Eurocup drivers
Italian Formula Renault 2.0 drivers
Belgian Formula Renault 1.6 drivers
British GT Championship drivers
World Series Formula V8 3.5 drivers
Porsche Supercup drivers
People from Mountain View, California
American emigrants to Spain
KTR drivers
Jenzer Motorsport drivers
Porsche Carrera Cup Germany drivers
Racing drivers from California